Blithe Spirit may refer to:
 Blithe Spirit (play), a 1941 comic play written by Noël Coward
 Blithe Spirit (1945 film), a British comedy film based on the play
 Blithe Spirit (2020 film), a British-American comedy film based on the play

See also
To a Skylark, poem ("Hail to Thee, blithe spirit ...) of Romantic Era, by P. B. Shelley
Blythe Spirit, 1981 jazz album by Arthur Blythe